Ponzano di Fermo is a comune (municipality) in the Province of Fermo in the Italian region Marche, located about  south of Ancona and about  north of Ascoli Piceno.

The municipality of Ponzano di Fermo contains the frazione (subdivision) Torchiaro e Capparuccia.

Ponzano di Fermo borders the following municipalities: Fermo, Grottazzolina, Monte Giberto, Monterubbiano, Petritoli.

Demographic evolution

References

Cities and towns in the Marche